Aviolo Lake is a lake in the Province of Brescia, Lombardy, Italy.

References 

Lakes of Lombardy